Alfred-Döblin-Stipendium (or the Alfred Döblin Scholarship, in English) is a literary prize of Germany that has been awarded to Berlin writers since 1985. It was named after the writer Alfred Döblin.

The recipient of the scholarship is selected by a jury of three, composed of one representative each from the Akademie der Künste, PEN Centre Germany, and the Berlin Senate Department for Science, Research and Culture.

Recipients receive a residency for three to twelve months and get paid 1,100 Euros per month during that time. They are required to stay at the Alfred Döblin House in Wewelsfleth.

The purpose of the scholarship is to help emerging writers in Berlin to focus on their literary work.

Noted scholars 

 Martin Ahrends
 María Cecilia Barbetta
 Eva Brunner
 Jonas-Philipp Dallmann
 Judith Hermann
 Massum Faryar
 Anja Frisch
 Julia Franck
 Steffen Jacobs
 Martin Jankowski
 Marcus Jensen
 Reinhard Jirgl
 Ingomar von Kieseritzky
 Norbert Kron
 André Kubiczek
 Sebastian Orlac
 Markus Seidel
 Rajvinder Singh
 Anja Tuckermann
 David Wagner
 Michael Wildenhain
 Peter Wawerzinek
 Thomas Weiss
 Ron Winkler
 Thorsten Becker
 Manja Präkels
 Karsten Krampitz

References

German literary awards
Awards established in 1985
1985 establishments in Germany